New Haven station is a historic train station located at New Haven, Allen County, Indiana.  It was built in 1890 by the Wabash Railroad.  It is a one-story, wood-frame building, with Stick Style / Eastlake movement ornamentation.  It measures approximately 50 feet long and 20 feet wide and has a gable roof and board and batten siding.

It was added to the National Register of Historic Places in 2003 as the Wabash Railroad Depot.

References

Former Wabash Railroad stations
Railway stations on the National Register of Historic Places in Indiana
Railway stations in the United States opened in 1890
Queen Anne architecture in Indiana
Transportation buildings and structures in Allen County, Indiana
National Register of Historic Places in Allen County, Indiana
Former railway stations in Indiana